WLEE (1570 AM) is a radio station licensed to serve Winona, Mississippi, United States. The station is currently owned by Seth Kent, through licensee Back Fourty Broadcasting, LLC.

WLEE broadcasts a country music format including select news programming from AP Radio.

The station, established in 1958, was assigned the call sign WONA by the Federal Communications Commission. The station changed its call sign to WLEE on March 15, 2016.

References

External links

LEE (AM)
Country radio stations in the United States
Radio stations established in 1958
Winona, Mississippi
1958 establishments in Mississippi